Bershet is a rural locality (a selo) and the administrative center of Bershetskoye Rural Settlement, Permsky District, Perm Krai, Russia. The population was 3,308 as of 2010. There are 70 streets.

Geography 
Bershet is located 34 km south of Perm (the district's administrative centre) by road. Zvyozdny is the nearest rural locality.

References 

Rural localities in Permsky District